Karachi Express is a passenger train operated daily by Pakistan Railways between Karachi and Lahore.

History
The Karachi Express began in 1943 and was originally between Karachi and Peshawar. Shortly after, the route was shortened between Karachi to Lahore. In 1999, Pakistan Railways began running non-stop, with only one technical stop at Khanpur. By 2003, economy class coaches were added and ceased to be a non-stop train. During the PPP government in Pakistan, 2008–2013, the train service was almost completely finished due to shortage of power vans and locomotives. During much of 2012, the train was only running with only economy class coaches and coupled with Millat Express from Khanewal onwards to Karachi. On 16 May 2013, the train was refurbished and a new rake was arranged that included 10 Economy, 3 AC Business, 2 AC Standard and 1 AC Sleeper class coaches. The route of the train was also changed so that now the train is running between Karachi and Lahore via Lodhran-Multan-Khanewal section instead of the Lodhran-Jahanian-Khanewal section. The train still covers the  distance between Karachi and Lahore in 18 hours.

Route
 Karachi Cantonment–Lahore Junction via Karachi–Peshawar Railway Line

Station stops
Karachi Cantonment
Hyderabad Junction
Nawabshah
Rohri Junction
Bahawalpur
Multan Cantonment
Khanewal Junction
Sahiwal
Raiwind Junction
Lahore Junction

Incidents
 Ghotki train crash
 In its worst accident three passenger trains collided on 13 July 2005, derailing 13 carriages and leaving at least 120 dead. The Karachi Express ran into the back of the Quetta Express while it was stopped at a station near Ghotki, and the Tezgam travelling in the opposite direction hit several of the derailed carriages. According to officials, the conductor of the Karachi Express misread a signal.
 Mehrabpur train derailment
 On 19 December 2007, Karachi Express derailed near the town of Mehrabpur in the Sindh province of Pakistan. At around 2:25 a.m. local time, fourteen of the train's sixteen carriages left the tracks, some being mangled by the crash, others simply sliding down an embankment into the water. Sabotage and terrorism were ruled out as the reason for the crash, with officials believing a faulty track was the cause of the derailment.
Sukkur train derailment
On March 6, 2021, the Karachi Express, headed from Karachi to Lahore, derailed near Sukkur District, injuring 13 passengers.

References 

Named passenger trains of Pakistan
Passenger trains in Pakistan